is a Japanese actress, voice actress, and singer from Nara Prefecture. She is currently affiliated with Amuse Inc..

About 
Isobe graduated from Osaka University of Arts' Department of Performing Arts. 

She was the Nara representative for Miss Universe Japan in 2014.

While her career in voice-acting began with video game Mahocole, where she also sings the game's soundtracks, Isobe's singing career began in 2015 through television anime Go! Princess Precure where she sang the opening theme.

Isobe formerly belonged to agency office EFFECT until 2015 where she moved to Office EN-JIN. In 2018, she announced her departure from the agency to become a freelancer. In March 2019, Isobe joined Amuse.

In 2019, she became a part of newly formed vocal & performance unit BlooDye as one of the vocalist along with Kanako Takatsuki.

In 2021, Isobe formed a choir unit Healer Girls along with Akane Kumada, Marina Horiuchi, and Chihaya Yoshitake.

Her special skills includes Jazz dance, Nihon-buyō, Ballet, and piano.

Notable works

Anime 
 Just Because! (2017) as Mio Natsume
Rifle is Beautiful (2017) as Tae Nakagawa
Interspecies Reviewers (2020) as Mii
Iwa-Kakeru! Climbing Girls (2020) as Hifumi Benibana
 Assault Lily Fruits (2021) as Takane Miyagawa
 Petit Sekai (2022) as Saki Tenma
 Healer Girl (2022) as Kana Fujii
 Immoral Guild (2022) as Hitamu Kyan
 The Idolmaster Shiny Colors (2024) as Kogane Tsukioka

Video games 
 Mahocole ~Mahou☆Idol Collection~ (2014) as Plum Hoshikawa   
 Idol Incidents (2016~2017) as Yukino Miyake
 THE IDOLM@STER SHINY COLORS (2018~) as Kogane Tsukioka 
 Azur Lane (2018) as Ariake 
Kono Subarashii Sekai ni Shukufuku o! Fantastic Days (2020) as Shiero 
Project Sekai: Colorful Stage! feat. Hatsune Miku (2020~) as Saki Tenma 
Assault Lily: Last Bullet (2021~) as Takane Miyagawa
Uma Musume Pretty Derby (2022~) as Daiichi Ruby

Stage play 
 Bloom Into You  (2019) as Sayaka Saeki
 Also in spin off Bloom Into You: Regarding Sayaka Saeki  (2020)
Brave 10  (2017) as Isanami
K The Stage 2 -Arousal Of King-  (2018) as Anna Kushina
Also in sequels K -Lost Small World-  (2016) and K -MISSING KINGS-  (2017)
 The Rising of the Shield Hero  (2021) as Raftalia

Dubbing 
 The Last Summoner (2023) as Miaowu

Other 
 Onsen Musume (2019) as Touka Yunohara

Notes

References

External links 

Official agency profile 

Living people
Voice actresses from Nara Prefecture
Japanese video game actresses
Japanese voice actresses
1994 births
Anime singers
21st-century Japanese actresses
21st-century Japanese singers
21st-century Japanese women singers